Parakkal Unnikrishnan (born 9 July 1966) is an Indian Carnatic vocalist and playback singer.

Early life and background
Unnikrishnan was born to K. Radhakrishnan and Dr. Harini Radhakrishnan in Palakkad, Kerala.
The family home, Kesari Kuteeram, was a well-known landmark of Madras city, with great grandfather Dr. K. N. Kesari, an Ayurvedic physician and the promoter of the Telugu women's magazine Gruhalakshmi.

He went to Asan Memorial Senior Secondary School, Chennai. He later transferred to Santhome Higher Secondary School in Chennai and completed his schooling in 1984. He graduated from Ramakrishna Mission Vivekananda College, Chennai, and received his B.Com degree from the Madras University. He earned a General Law and Post Graduate Diploma in Personnel Management and Industrial Relations.

He worked as an executive in Parry's Confectionery Ltd. from 1987 to 1994, when he quit his job to become a professional singer.

Singing career

Unnikrishnan was initiated into Carnatic music at age of 12 by V. L. Seshadri. He was inspired by Sangita Kalanidhi Dr. S. Ramanathan. He attended a special workshop for six months on "Veena Dhanammal Bhani" under Sangeetha Kalanidhi T. Brinda and Sangeetha Kalanidhi Dr. T. Vishwa Nathan.

He won the National Film Award for Best Male Playback Singer for his debut film songs "Ennavale Adi Ennavale" and "Uyirum Neeye". These songs were composed by A. R. Rahman, with whom Unnikrishnan gave most of his memorable songs. He is the first male playback singer to be awarded the national award for a Tamil song. He was one of the permanent judges in the reality television show AIRTEL Super Singer on Vijay TV in seasons (2006, 2008, 2010–2011, 2013, 2015–2016, 2018) and 2008 Idea Star Singer on Asianet.

Unnikrishnan is also becoming known for his experimental work. In 2008, he presented a novel jazz concert in Thiruvananthapuram with the Eli Yamin Jazz Quartet and pianist Anil Srinivasan.

He prefers singing classical songs over pop music. He is the recipient of many awards like Tamil Nadu's Kalaimamani, Nada Bhushanam, Isai Peroli, Yuva Kala Bharathi, Isayin Punnagai, Isai Selvam, Sangeetha Kalasarathy, Sangeetha Chakravarthy. In 2014, he received the Kerala Sangeetha Nataka Akademi Award for Classical Music.

In 2012, Unnikrishnan rendered a series of Devotional songs on Lord Ganesha, Lord Ayyappan, Lord Venkateswara, and Devi among others. The albums were produced by Gaananjali Recordings and were composed and released by Manachanallur Giridharan. The album titles include Ayyan Malai Engal Malai, Om Nava Sakthi Jaya Jaya Sakthi, Sabarimalai Va Charanam Solli Va, Vindhaigal Purindhai Nee En Vazhvile, jeans, and Uchi Pillaiyare Charanam. Notable among them is the Harivarasanam, part of the Ayyappa album and is the only other popular rendering after the famous K. J. Yesudas's.

Personal life
Unnikrishnan is married to Priya, a Bharathanatyam and Mohiniyattam dancer and a native of Kozhikode, Kerala. They were married in November 1994 and have 2 children – a son named Vasudev Krishna and a daughter named Uthara. Uthara won the National award for playback singing for her debut song "Azhagu" in the movie "Saivam". Both Unnikrishnan and Uthara received national awards for their debut songs.

Vasudev is passionate about cricket and is a member of the Madras Cricket Club and Life Member of the Tamil Nadu Cricket Association.

References

External links

 
 
 Artists Profiles : P.Unnikrishnan

1966 births
Living people
Indian male playback singers
Singers from Kerala
Film musicians from Kerala
Musicians from Palakkad
Tamil Nadu State Film Awards winners
20th-century Indian singers
Malayalam playback singers
Tamil playback singers
Telugu playback singers
Kannada playback singers
21st-century Indian singers
Best Male Playback Singer National Film Award winners
20th-century Indian male singers
21st-century Indian male singers
Recipients of the Kerala Sangeetha Nataka Akademi Award